The 2016–17 Kenya Cup is the 47th edition of the top flight of Kenyan domestic rugby union competition.

Reduced in size from fourteen teams in the previous season to twelve, the league consists of each team playing sixteen matches followed by the top six clubs qualifying for the playoffs.

The reigning champions entering the tournament are Kabras Sugar RFC who defeated Impala Saracens 22–5 in the final the previous year.

Thika RFC and Kenya Sharks were relegated following the 2015–16 season. No teams were promoted.

Pools

The twelve teams of the Kenya Cup are divided into two pools of six. Each team plays each team in the same pool twice, then plays each team in the opposite pool once.

Standings

Table updated through 25 March 2017

Regular season

Week 1

Week 2

Week 3

Week 4

Week 5

Week 6

Week 7

Week 8

Week 9

Week 10

Week 11

Week 12

Week 13

Week 14

Week 15

Week 16

Playoffs

Top Six Playoffs

Semi-finals

Final

References

rugby union
rugby union
2016 in African rugby union
2017 in African rugby union
2016–17 rugby union tournaments for clubs